Yaratovo (Yarat) is a rural locality (a selo) and the administrative centre of Yaratovsky Selsoviet, Baymaksky District, Bashkortostan, Russia. The population was 516 as of 2010. There are 19 streets.

Geography 
Yaratovo is located 36 km west of Baymak (the district's administrative centre) by road. Gumerovo is the nearest rural locality.

References 

Rural localities in Baymaksky District